Chetumal Bay is a large bay of the western Caribbean Sea on the southern coast of the Yucatán Peninsula. 

It is located in northern Belize and southeastern Mexico.

Geography
The mouth of Chetumal Bay is directed southward and buffered by the large Belizean island of Ambergris Caye.  

Corozal Bay is a smaller inland inlet, that extends to the southwest in the upper region of Chetumal Bay. It is named after the town of Corozal on it. 

Chetumal is a major city on the bay, located in the Mexican state of Quintana Roo.

See also

References

Bays of the Caribbean
Bays of Belize
Bays of Mexico
Landforms of Quintana Roo
Yucatán Peninsula
Chetumal
Mexican coast of the Caribbean